The Serpong–Balaraja Toll Road (shortened to Serbaraja Toll Road) is a toll road that connects Serpong with Balaraja, Tangerang Regency in the province of Banten, Indonesia. An extension from the Jakarta–Serpong Toll Road, it will provide access from Serpong to the Port of Merak via the Tangerang–Merak Toll Road.

History
Construction was initially scheduled to commence in 2016, but was delayed because of land acquisition issues. Construction of section 1A was completed in April 2022, and was opened for free public testing from 10 to 21 August 2022. The toll road was officially inaugurated on 20 September 2022. On 4 October 2022, The Ministry of Public Works and Housing officially imposed tariffs for Section 1A.

Building stages 
 Section 1: Rawabuntu–Legok (11.3 km). Rawabuntu–Cisauk segment by Wijaya Karya, Cisauk–Legok segment by Nusa Raya Cipta
 Section 2: Legok–South Tigaraksa (10.7 km)
 Section 3: South Tigaraksa–Balaraja (17.8 km)

Exits

References

Geography of Indonesia
Toll roads in Indonesia
Toll roads in Java
Banten